Georges, Count de Zogheb was an Austrian equestrian. He competed in the equestrian mail coach event at the 1900 Summer Olympics.

References

External links
 

Year of birth missing
Year of death missing
Austrian male equestrians
Olympic equestrians of Austria
Equestrians at the 1900 Summer Olympics
Place of birth missing
Place of death missing